Questiomycin A is an antibiotic made by the fungus Penicillium expansum.

See also
 Xantocillin

References

Antibiotics
Phenoxazines